Pyaar Kiya To Darna Kya is a black and white 1963 Indian Hindi film, directed by B.S. Ranga. The film starred Shammi Kapoor, B. Saroja Devi, Pran, Om Prakash, Helen, Agha and Prithviraj Kapoor. The film's music was by Ravi Shankar.

Plot
Rajesh (Shammi Kapoor) is the son of a rich father, Kunwar Sahib (Prithviraj Kapoor). Rajesh falls in love with Savita (B. Saroja Devi) a daughter of a teacher Ramdas (Nazir Hussain), who Rajesh got sacked and humiliated when he was younger. Savita successfully prods Rajesh to study harder in college instead of being a layabout and he ranks first in the whole college and wins a gold medal. Kunwar Sahib is not happy with his son's love affair and refuses to accept their love. But Rajesh marries Savita without his father's permission and comes home. Rajesh's father Kunwar Sahib does not greet them or accept them and he consequently insults Savita. Not happy with that, Rajesh leaves home and they start living at Jeevan's (Pran) house, who is one of his friends. Jeevan starts poisoning Rajesh's mind against Savita because Savita humiliated and slapped Jeevan when he tried to woo her in college. Big misunderstandings start creeping into their relationship. No long after the couple separate due to these misunderstandings that have been caused between them. After a while Jeevan's friend Rita (Helen) starts feeling guilty of the misunderstandings that have been caused and brings out the truth to Rajesh he feels guilty for his mistake.

Cast
 Prithviraj Kapoor as Kunwar Sahib
 Shammi Kapoor as Rajesh
 B. Saroja Devi as Savita
 Pran as Jeevan
 Om Prakash as Asharam
 Helen as Rita
 Agha as Banke
 Shubha Khote as Sarla
 Rukmani Devi as Parvati
 Pushpavalli as Kamla

Music

References

External links

1960s Hindi-language films
1963 films
Films scored by Ravi
Films directed by B. S. Ranga